Suhle may refer to:

Suhle (Hahle), a river of Lower Saxony, Germany, tributary of the Hahle
Berthold Suhle (1837–1904), German chess master